Animal protection may refer or be related to:

Animal law
Animal protectionism
Animal rights, including a list of animal welfare and rights by country
Animal rights movement
Animal shelter
Animal welfare
Conservation biology
Protected species

See also
Animal cruelty
List of animal advocacy parties
List of animal rights advocates
List of animal rights groups
List of animal welfare organisations